Air Canada Flight 624 was a scheduled Canadian domestic passenger flight from Toronto Pearson International Airport to Halifax Stanfield International Airport in Halifax, Nova Scotia. During heavy snow and poor visibility, at 00:43 ADT (03:43 UTC) on 29 March 2015, the Airbus A320-211 landed short of the runway and was severely damaged. Twenty-six people were injured.

Accident
Air Canada Flight 624 departed from Toronto Pearson International Airport (YYZ) bound for Halifax Stanfield International Airport (YHZ). It was carrying 133 passengers and five crew. The Airbus A320 operating the flight, registration C-FTJP, impacted the ground  short of the threshold of runway 05 (which is not equipped for precision landing), smashing through an ILS-LOC antenna array. This impact caused the landing gear to separate from the aircraft. The plane also impacted a power line, which cut power to the airport. The aircraft then climbed an embankment up to the runway level, skidded on its belly and stopped  past the threshold. The Halifax airport was without electricity for about 90 minutes.

The aircraft was extensively damaged, having lost all landing gear and its port engine. The wings and tailplane were also damaged. Both pilots, twenty-three passengers and a flight attendant were taken to hospital. None of the injuries were life-threatening, and all but one of those taken to hospital were released the same day. The weather at the time of the accident was described as "stormy" (winter conditions). The loss of power to the airport was due to the aircraft clipping transmission lines before hitting the ground. Electricity was restored to the airport by 02:12 ADT.

While the aircraft collided with objects outside the airport perimeter and was damaged beyond repair, Air Canada initially described the accident as a "hard landing".

Aircraft and crew

The aircraft was an Airbus A320-211 equipped with two CFM56-5A1 engines. Its serial number was 233 with a fleet number of 214, and it first flew in 1991. It was owned by GECAS and leased to Air Canada. As a result of the accident, the aircraft was written off.

The captain had been with Air Canada for more than nine years and had logged 11,765 flight hours, including 5,755 hours on the Airbus A320. The first officer had been with the airline for 15 years and had 11,300 flight hours, with 6,392 of them on the Airbus A320.

Investigation
The accident was investigated by the Transportation Safety Board of Canada. Three Bureau of Enquiry and Analysis for Civil Aviation Safety (BEA) investigators from France and two technical advisers from Airbus travelled to Canada to participate in the investigation. As a result of the accident, Air Canada revised its incorrect Airbus A320-200 Standard Operating Procedure.

The final report was released in May 2017, and showed no mechanical faults contributing to the accident. Instead pilot error was mainly to blame, as the crew followed relevant Air Canada flying procedures that contradicted Airbus and pilot training guidelines. Investigators determined that the airline's standard operating procedure in regard to the selected landing mode (Flight Path Angle Guidance) was over-reliant on the Airbus' automation and led to excessive loss of altitude. Per the SOP, the crew need not have monitored the aircraft's altitude or relation to the runway to make any subsequent adjustments to the flight path angle after the final approach fix. Subsequently, the captain and first officer failed to notice or respond to the fact that the aircraft autopilot selected a steep vertical angle flight path, causing a drop below the minimum safe altitude. Furthermore, limited visibility hampered the crew's ability to accurately perceive their surroundings.

Litigation 
A class action lawsuit was introduced against Air Canada, the Halifax Airport, NAV Canada, Transport Canada, Airbus and the aircraft's pilots which alleges that negligence on the part of the defendants caused the crash, inflicting physical and psychological harm onto the passengers. Other separate lawsuits are being assessed by medical professionals, with settlements based on the relative severity of each client's injuries.

On 30 March 2017, Air Canada filed a lawsuit against Airbus, alleging that the manufacturer "failed to identify shortcomings of the Airbus A320", which included uncommanded descent below the pre-programmed glide path.

See also
 Accidents and incidents involving the Airbus A320 family
 Air Inter Flight 148, another case of an Airbus A320 descending improperly leading to a CFIT

References

Further reading

External links
 Transportation Safety Board of Canada: "Collision with terrain involving an Air Canada Airbus A320 at Stanfield International Airport, Halifax, Nova Scotia" 
 Air Canada: "Air Canada provides Update on AC624"
 Post-accident photos – TSBCanada on Flickr
 

Aviation accidents and incidents in 2015
Airliner accidents and incidents in Canada
Accidents and incidents involving the Airbus A320
Air Canada accidents and incidents
2015 disasters in Canada
Airliner accidents and incidents involving controlled flight into terrain
March 2015 events in Canada
History of Halifax, Nova Scotia
Halifax Stanfield International Airport
Airliner accidents and incidents caused by pilot error